The Assemblée parlementaire de la Francophonies (APF) is an association of the parliaments of Francophone countries.

History
It was established in Luxembourg in 1967, and was then known as the Association internationale des parlementaires de langue française.

External links 
  (in French)

Francophonie